Cyril Owen Buker (February 5, 1918 – October 11, 2011) was a Major League Baseball pitcher who played for the Brooklyn Dodgers in 1945.

Buker is one of many ballplayers who only appeared in the major leagues during World War II. He made his major league debut in relief on May 17, 1945, against the Pittsburgh Pirates at Ebbets Field. His first major league win came in his first start, on June 21, 1945, as the Dodgers defeated the Philadelphia Phillies 9–2 at Shibe Park. Andy Karl was the losing pitcher.

His season and career totals for 42 games include a 7–2 record, four games started, 22 games finished, five saves, and an ERA of 3.30 in 87 innings pitched. Besides pitching well, Buker could swing the bat. He was 3-for-16 (.188) with a walk and two runs batted in.

Following his Brooklyn days, Buker eventually returned to his hometown of Greenwood, Wisconsin where he began a successful coaching career, eventually being named to the Wisconsin Football and Basketball Coaches Association Hall of Fame. His son, Tom, would later coach at the school, leading it to class C titles in boys' basketball and baseball in 1988.

Buker died on October 11, 2011, in Greenwood, Wisconsin.

References

External links 

Major League Baseball pitchers
Baseball players from Wisconsin
Brooklyn Dodgers players
1918 births
2011 deaths
People from Greenwood, Wisconsin
Wisconsin Badgers baseball players
Clinton Giants players
Wausau Timberjacks players
Wisconsin Rapids White Sox players
St. Paul Saints (AA) players
Montreal Royals players
Milwaukee Brewers (minor league) players
Kansas City Blues (baseball) players
Little Rock Travelers players
Minneapolis Millers (baseball) players
Lincoln A's players
Sioux City Soos players